The list of political families, (where there have been more than one leader in a single family) from the Odisha state of India. This only lists politician members.

The Biswal Family 
Chiranjib Biswal
Ranjib Biswal

The Mahatab Family 
Harekrushna Mahatab
Bhartruhari Mahtab, son of Harekrushna Mahatab

The Patnaik Family 
Biju Patnaik
Naveen Patnaik, son of Biju Patnaik

The Kanungo Family
 Sarala Devi
 Nityanand Kanungo

The Satapathy Family 
 Nandini Satpathy
Tathagata Satapathy, son of Nandini Satapathy
The Pattanaik(j) family
 Janaki Ballabh Patnaik
Jayanti Patnaik wife of above
Routray Family
Nilamani Routray

References

Odisha
 
Odisha-related lists